MD 500 may refer to:

 Maryland Route 500, a state highway in the United States
 McDonnell Douglas MD 500 Defender, a light multi-role military helicopter
 MD Helicopters MD 500, a family of light utility civilian and military helicopters